Picayune is the largest city in Pearl River County, Mississippi, United States. The population was 10,878 at the 2010 census. Picayune is part of the New Orleans–Metairie–Hammond combined statistical area.

History
The word "picayune" was the name of a Spanish coin, worth half a real. Its name derives from the French "picaillon", which is itself from the Provençal "picaioun", the name of an unrelated small copper coin from Savoy. By extension, picayune can mean "trivial" or "of little value". Picayune was incorporated in 1904, and was named by Eliza Jane Poitevent Nicholson in 1884, the owner and publisher of the New Orleans Daily Picayune, a newspaper named for the coin.

The local post office contained a mural, subsequently covered over, Lumber Region of Mississippi, painted by Donald H. Robertson in 1940. Federally commissioned murals were produced from 1934 to 1943 in the United States through the Section of Painting and Sculpture, later called the Section of Fine Arts, of the Treasury Department.

Hurricane Katrina
While Picayune received extensive damage from Hurricane Katrina, it was not as severe as in other nearby cities. This caused Picayune to become the temporary home for many who relocated from the New Orleans area and from the Mississippi Gulf Coast who were seeking a safer home site with easy commuting to those areas.

The bulk of the Katrina damage in Picayune was caused by high winds, as the eye wall passed over the city. This resulted in widespread roof, window, and fence damage. The wind also caused hundreds, if not thousands, of downed trees and power outages of up to a few weeks.

Geography
Picayune is a part of the New Orleans–Metairie–Hammond combined statistical area.

Demographics

2020 census

As of the 2020 United States census, there were 11,885 people, 4,457 households, and 2,951 families residing in the city.

2000 census
As of the census of 2000, there were 10,535 people, 4,100 households, and 2,865 families residing in the city. The population density was 895.6 people per square mile (345.9/km). There were 4,568 housing units at an average density of 388.3 per square mile (150.0/km). The racial makeup of the city was 62.02% White, 35.92% African American, 0.38% Native American, 0.30% Asian, 0.05% Pacific Islander, 0.18% from other races, and 1.15% from two or more races. Hispanic or Latino of any race were 1.15% of the population.

There were 4,100 households, out of which 31.8% had a children under the age of 18 living with them, 45.0% were married couples living together, 20.8% had a female householder with no husband present, and 30.1% were non-families. 26.4% of all households were made up of individuals, and 11.8% had someone living alone who was 65 years of age or older. The average household size was 2.54 and the average family size was 3.06.

In the city, the population was spread out, with 27.0% under the age of 18, 9.4% from 18 to 24, 25.5% from 25 to 44, 23.0% from 45 to 64, and 15.1% who were 65 years of age or older. The median age was 36 years. For every 100 females, there were 82.8 males. For every 100 females age 18 and over, there were 79.2 males.

The median income for a household in the city is $26,958, and the median income for a family was $33,260. Males had a median income of $31,438 versus $20,035 for females. The per capita income for the city was $15,798. About 18.9% of families and 20.8% of the population were below the poverty line, including 28.2% of those under age 18 and 17.6% of those age 65 or over.

Education
 The City of Picayune is served by the Picayune School District.
 Picayune Junior High School serves as the middle school for grades 7 and 8. Picayune Memorial High School is the local high school. The school's mascot is the Maroon Tide.
 The Center of Alternate Education is also located in Picayune.

All of Pearl River County is in the service area of Pearl River Community College.

Elementary schools
 Nicholson Elementary
 Roseland Park Elementary
 South Side Elementary
 West Side Elementary

Media

Newspaper
Picayune's local newspaper is the Picayune Item.

Radio
The local radio station is WRJW 1320-AM.

Television and radio stations that are part of the New Orleans and Gulfport–Biloxi listening areas serve the city.

Government
The United States Postal Service operates the Picayune Post Office. There is a mural made by the Works Progress Administration (WPA) but subsequent renovations covered up the mural with new paint.

Infrastructure

Transportation
Amtrak's Crescent train connects Picayune with the cities of New York, Philadelphia, Baltimore, Washington, Charlotte, Atlanta, Birmingham, and New Orleans. The Amtrak station is situated at 100 South U.S. Route 11. There is tri-weekly service in each direction.

U.S. 11 is the main highway through Picayune. Interstate 59 (via Interstate 10) connects Picayune with New Orleans, LA, to the south and Hattiesburg, MS, Meridian, MS, and Birmingham, AL, to the north.

Mississippi Highway 43 is the main connection to and from the east, connecting to Interstate 10 near Kiln, MS.

Picayune Municipal Airport has a  runway and is a popular destination for private fixed-wing and rotary aircraft visiting the New Orleans area. Rental car, taxi and limousine services are available.

Railroads
 Norfolk Southern Railway

Major highways
 U.S. Route 11
 Mississippi Highway 43
 Interstate 59

Library
The Margaret Reed Crosby Memorial Library serves Picayune and is the headquarters of the Pearl River County Library System.

Notable people
 Jonathan Bender, professional basketball player
 Gary Goff, college football coach
 T. J. House, professional baseball player
 Rhyne Hughes, professional baseball player
 Michael Holloway Perronne, writer
 Matt Riser, college baseball coach
 Cailey Fleming, actress

Points of interest
 Crosby Arboretum
 Bogue Chitto National Wildlife Refuge
 Stennis Space Center

References

Cities in Mississippi
Cities in Pearl River County, Mississippi